This article presents official statistics gathered during the COVID-19 pandemic in Italy.

Statistics

Data quality issues
Deaths statistics for Italy include coronavirus victims who died in hospital, as well as those who died outside of hospitals and were tested before or after dying. Post-mortem tests are routinely carried out, and there is no distinction between people who died "with" or "of" coronavirus, including patients with pre-existing conditions, which make up 96% of the total death count. However, in regions where the healthcare system has been overwhelmed by the pandemic (e.g. Lombardy), official death statistics likely missed a portion of deaths outside hospitals. In some areas of northern Italy, a comparison of the average registered deaths over the previous years with the deaths in the first months of 2020 showed a sizeable excess of deaths that were not officially included in the coronavirus toll. In the month of March, 10,900 excess deaths have been estimated, that have not been reported as COVID-19 deaths.

Not all European countries count coronavirus-related deaths with the same criteria. For instance, in some other European countries, a distinction is made between deaths caused by coronavirus and deaths of people infected with coronavirus, thus often excluding deaths of people with pre-existing conditions. In addition to this, some countries only report deaths in hospitals.

Confirmed cases, deaths, and recoveries

Charts
The graphs show the development of the pandemic starting from 21 February 2020, the day when the Lombardy and Veneto clusters were first detected.

References-

statistics
Italy